Allan "Bud" Gulka (born April 12, 1947) is a Canadian former professional ice hockey player.

During the 1974–75 season, Gulka played five games in the World Hockey Association with the Vancouver Blazers.

References

External links

1947 births
Living people
Canadian ice hockey forwards
Ice hockey people from Saskatchewan
Vancouver Blazers players